Holy Culture is the 4th album from the Christian hip hop group the Cross Movement, released on April 22, 2003. Includes The Ambassador, Phanatik, Tonic and Tru-Life. Produced by Kevin Arthur, Lee Jerkins, Official, The Tonic and Virgil Byrd.

Music videos
A music video was made for the song "When I Flow"

Track listing
Holy Culture
When I Flow (It's Gospel)
Interlude: Industry
In Not Of
It's Going Down
Interlude: Cats Know
Free
Forever
Cry No More (feat. J.R.)
Start Somethin’
Times Table
Interlude: Medicine
Rise Up
Driven
Closer to You (feat. J.R.)
L.L.R.P.
Live It
Interlude: Laborers
Eternal Cypha (feat. Da’ T.R.U.T.H., J-Silas, Todd Bangz, R-Swift, FLAME)
DJ Official Speaks
Interlude: H.C. Panel Discussion

External links
 

2003 albums
The Cross Movement albums
Cross Movement Records albums